S-comma (majuscule: Ș, minuscule: ș) is a letter which is part of the Romanian alphabet, used to represent the sound , the voiceless postalveolar fricative (like sh in shoe).

History 

Unicode support
S-comma was not initially supported in early Unicode versions, nor in the predecessors like ISO/IEC 8859-2 and Windows-1250. Instead, Ş (S-cedilla), a character available since Unicode  1.1.0 (1993), was used for digital texts written in Romanian. In some contexts, like with low-resolution screens and printouts, the visual distinction between ș and ş is minimal. Nevertheless, encoding for the S-comma was not supported in retail versions of Microsoft Windows XP, but a later European Union Expansion Font Update provided the feature. While digital accessibility to S-comma has since improved, both characters continue to be used interchangeably in various contexts like publishing.

The letter is part of Unicode's Latin Extended-B range, under "Additions for Romanian", titled as "Latin capital letter S with comma below" (U+0218) and "Latin small letter s with comma below" (U+0219). In HTML, these can be encoded by &#x0218; and &#x0219;, respectively.

Use of the comma with the letter S

Romanian
The Romanian letter  (S with comma) represents the voiceless postalveolar fricative  (as in "show"). On outdated systems which do not support the glyph, the symbol  (S with cedilla) is used. Example word: .

Character encoding

See also
Ş (S-cedilla)
Š
Ț (T-comma)
D̦ (D-comma)

References

S-comma
S-comma